Robert Norman Warner (December 13, 1950 – June 27, 2020) was a Canadian professional ice hockey forward.

Early life 
Warner was born in Grimsby, Ontario. He played junior ice hockey with the Ottawa 67's. From the 1970–1971 season to 1974–1975 season, Warner played for Saint Mary's University of Minnesota.

Career 
Warner played 10 regular season and four playoff games for the Toronto Maple Leafs of the National Hockey League between 1976 and 1977. The rest of his career, which lasted from 1970 to 1980, was spent in various minor leagues.

Career statistics

Regular season and playoffs

References

External links
 

1950 births
2020 deaths
Canadian expatriate ice hockey players in the United States
Canadian ice hockey right wingers
Dallas Black Hawks players
Eastern Hockey League players
Ice hockey people from Ontario
New Brunswick Hawks players
Oklahoma City Blazers (1965–1977) players
Ottawa 67's players
People from Grimsby, Ontario
Saint Mary's University (Halifax) alumni
Toronto Maple Leafs players
Undrafted National Hockey League players
Saint Mary's University of Minnesota alumni